Olive Branch is an unincorporated community in Clermont County, in the U.S. state of Ohio.

History
Olive Branch was not officially platted. A post office called Olive Branch was established in 1845, and remained in operation until 1922.

References

Unincorporated communities in Clermont County, Ohio
Unincorporated communities in Ohio